The Victorian Railways P class was a class of  goods locomotives operated by the Victorian Railways between 1860 and 1921.

References

Specific

External links
 P class locomotive no. 7, circa 1865
 P class steam locomotive no. 3

0-6-0 locomotives
P class 1859
Railway locomotives introduced in 1859
Broad gauge locomotives in Australia
Scrapped locomotives
Beyer, Peacock locomotives